Matt Schofield (born 21 August 1977, Manchester, England) is an English blues guitarist and singer. His band, the Matt Schofield Trio, play their own material, a blend of blues, funk and jazz, as well as covers of blues classics such as Albert Collins' "Lights Are On, But Nobody's Home".

Schofield is regarded as one of the most distinctive and innovative British blues guitarists, and has been rated in the top ten of British blues guitarists by Guitar & Bass Magazine. Schofield's prowess has taken his band to twelve countries, seen him playing with musicians including Buddy Guy and Robben Ford, and brought a note in the Penguin Book of Blues Recordings as one of only two living British artists to gain the maximum four-star rating. In addition, he has been admitted to the British Blues Awards Hall of Fame.

Influences 

Schofield's guitar playing is often likened to that of Robben Ford in its melodic and fluid style, and jazzy lines.

Schofield has been influenced by B.B. King, Freddie King, Albert King, Muddy Waters, Steve Winwood, Eric Clapton, Albert Collins, Jimi Hendrix, Billy Gibbons, Stevie Ray Vaughan, Jimmie Vaughan, and Tomo Fujita.

Career

Recordings
Schofield has recorded five studio albums and four live albums. The first of the live discs, The Trio, Live was recorded at the Bishop's Blues club at The Half Moon, Bishop's Stortford in 2004 and, funded and released by Richard Pavitt on his Nugene record label, gave the band their first breakthrough. The first studio album, Siftin' Thru Ashes was released in 2005. This album showcased Schofield as a songwriter, writing or co-writing eight out of eleven of the tracks. AllMusic called Schofield's approach "an enjoyable demonstration of what can happen when blues-rock and blues-jazz are united". The second live album, Live at the Jazz Cafe! was recorded at the London Jazz Cafe in April 2005, and was made available as a web only release. Schofield is one of only two living British artists to be given a four star (excellent) rating in the Penguin Book of Blues Recordings.

The release of The Trio, Live prompted Schofield to be featured in a Guitarist magazine article, listing the nine notable up and coming blues guitarists, Schofield being the only non-American. Of the album they said "britblues meets jazz via N'Orleans – all played with the kind of sizzling guitar that just does not often surface in Fairford, Gloucestershire". In 2007, Guitar & Bass Magazine picked Schofield as one of the "Top 10 British Blues Guitarists of All Time". In August 2009, Schofield released Heads, Tails, & Aces, his third studio effort. The next year (2010) the band collected the Album of the Year award at the British Blues Awards for this album, and released Live from the Archive, recorded in 2007 in the Netherlands. Schofield won the British Blues Guitarist and Jonny Henderson won the British Keyboard Player award, and they both won these awards in 2011, too.

In 2011, the trio released their fourth album Anything but Time, with Kevin Hayes on drums and John Porter as record producer. Guitarinstructor.com, a part of the Hal Leonard organisation, has this album as No 5 in their top 10 albums of 2011, while Mojo magazine picked it as No 1 of Blues albums in 2011.

In 2012, Schofield made available a third live album Ten From The Road, consisting of material performed live in November 2011 by Schofield with Henderson & Hayes.

He released his fifth studio album, called Far As I Can See, in February 2014.

Band
Schofield performs with an organ trio (guitar, organ, and drums). Organ trios are mostly associated with the 1950s and 1960s US soul jazz groups led by organists such as Jimmy Smith. Blues bands more commonly use trios of guitar, bass and drums, quartets (guitar, keyboards, bass, and drums) or quintets (guitar, rhythm guitar, keyboards, bass, and drums). In Schofield's organ trio, organist Jonny Henderson plays a Hammond organ, performing basslines using his left hand, and playing chords and lead lines with his right hand. The trio's drummer is Evan Jenkins. Jeff Walker played bass on the final track of Siftin' Thru' Ashes. In 2009, as of the recording of Heads, Tails & Aces, The Matt Schofield Trio became The Matt Schofield Band, a four-piece, featuring Jeff 'The Funk' Walker on bass, and also replacing Evan Jenkins with Alain Baudry. Jeff Walker was later replaced by Spanish bassist Javier Garcia Vicente. At a concert at the Swindon Arts Centre on 22 October 2009, the band reverted to a trio. In June 2010, Kevin Hayes, replaced Evan Jenkins in the band. The 2012 Europe Tour, the trio was back with its original formation, with Matt Schofield, Evan Jenkins and Jonny Henderson.

Endorsements and gear
Boutique amplifier company Two-Rock developed the Schofield Signature amplifier for Matt. According to Matt, the amplifier is "simply the best amplifier I've ever plugged into, and I'm honoured it carries my name".

Japanese Effects Pedal company Free The Tone also developed the custom MS SOV SPECIAL overdrive pedal for him and released it as a limited edition product in 2013. A full production version, the MS SOV MS-2V, was later released in 2014.

Discography

2004: The Trio, Live (NUG601)
Uncle Junior
Everyday I Have The Blues
Bloody Murder
Treat Me Lowdown
Cissy Strut
Travellin' South
Sittin' On Top of the World
Hippology
2005: Live at the Jazz Café (NUG503)
All You Need
Uncle Junior
Lights Are On, But Nobody's Home
Travellin' South
Cissy Strut
On My Way
It's Your Thing
2005: Siftin' Thru' Ashes (NUG501)
All You Need
Siftin' Thru Ashes
Djam
Lights Are On, But Nobody's Home
The Letter
Back at Square One
People Say
How I Try
On My Way
Middle Ground
Hard Lines
2007: Ear to the Ground
Pack it Up
Troublemaker
Ear to the Ground
Heart Don't Need a Compass
Once in a While
Room at the Back
Someone
Searchin'
Move Along
Cookie Jar
When it all Comes Down
2009: Heads, Tails & Aces
What I Wanna Hear
Live Wire
War We Wage
Betting Man
Lay It Down
Can't Put You Down
Woman Across the River
Nothing Left
I Told Ya
Stranger Blues
Not Raining Now
2010:Live From The Archive
All You Need
Siftin' Thru Ashes
Band Intro
Lights Are on But Nobody's Home
Room at the Back
On My Way
Black Cat Bone
Sitting on Top of the World
The Letter
2011: Anything But Time
Anything But Time
See Me Through
At Times We Do Forget
Shipwrecked
Dreaming of You
Wrapped Up in Love
Where Do I Have to Stand
One Look (and I'm Hooked)
Don't Know What I'd Do
Share Our Smile Again
2012: Ten From The Road
Ear to the Ground
Don't Know What I'd Do
Live Wire
Where Do I Have To Stand
Anything But Time
Dreaming of You
Shipwrecked
See Me Through
Siftin' Thru Ashes
Not Raining Now
2014: Far As I Can See
From Far Away
Clean Break
Getaway
Breaking Up Somebody's Home
The Day You Left
Oakville Shuffle
Hindsight
Everything
Yellow Moon
Tell Me Some Lies
Red Dragon

Other albums Matt Schofield has appeared on
Back To Blues (1998) – Dana Gillespie
Two Timing Lover Boy (1999) – Dino Baptiste
Mustique Blues Festival (1999) - various artists
My Day Is Just Beginning (2000) – The Lee Sankey Group
She's Not Alone (EP) (2000) – The Lee Sankey Group
Mustique Blues Festival (2000) - various artists
Experienced (2000) – Dana Gillespie
Songs of Love (2001) – Dana Gillespie
Staying Power (2002) – Dana Gillespie
So Lowdown Tour (2002) - The Lester Butler Tribute Band
Basil´s Bar Blues (2003) - various artists
Driving Savage Groove (2004) – Cool Buzz Harmonica Posse; Schofield appears with The Urban Achievers
Mustique Blues Festival (2004) - various artists
Meat And Potatoes (2005) – Ian Siegal – co-produced by Schofield
A Different Picture (2005) – Earl Green
These Blue Nights (2006) - Dana Gillespie
New Road Sessions Vol. 1 (2006) - The Backbones
At The North Sea Jazz Festival (DVD) (2006) - Ian Siegal
Live With The London Blues Band (2007) - Dana Gillespie
Swagger (2007) – Ian Siegal – produced by Schofield 
Broadside (2009) - Ian Siegal – produced by Schofield
The Six Sessions (2010) - various artists - Schofield appears with Jan Akkerman
Live At Bluesnow! (2016) - Big Pete – liner notes by Schofield
On Down the Road (2016) - JL Fulks
Walkin' The Blues (2019) - Federico Luiu

References

External links
Matt Schofield official website
Nugene Records
British Blues Awards
Interview with Matt Schofield on Myth vs. Craft podcast

1977 births
Living people
English blues guitarists
English male guitarists
English blues musicians
English blues singers
Blues rock musicians
21st-century English singers
21st-century British guitarists
21st-century British male singers
Provogue Records artists